Xue Changrui (born 31 May 1991) is a Chinese track and field athlete who competes in the pole vault. His personal best is 5.82 m. He was the champion at the Asian Athletics Championships in 2013 and at the Asian Games in 2014.

Career 

Born in Shandong Province, he originally started out in the long jump and set a best of 7.15 metres at the age of seventeen. He emerged as a pole vaulter in 2011 and after competing on the Chinese Athletics Grand Prix circuit he finished third at the Chinese Athletics Championships with a vault of 5.30 m. He gradually improved in 2012, winning the national Tianjin meet with a clearance of 5.40 m before finishing as runner-up to Yang Yansheng (another Shandong vaulter) at the national championships with a personal best of 5.60 m.

Xue began to establish himself as an elite level vaulter in 2013. Competing abroad for the first time, he achieved a best of 5.75 m in Nevers, France. He was second at the nationals in May but won the Chinese Grand Prix Final with a vault of 5.65 m (an outdoor best). At the 2013 Asian Athletics Championships the conditions for jumping were poor but he dominated the competition, winning the gold medal with 5.60 m, 40 centimetres ahead of runner-up Lu Yao.

He finished fourth at the 2017 World Championships in London, jumping a Chinese record of 5.82 m.

Competition record

1Representing Asia

References

External links

Living people
1991 births
Chinese male pole vaulters
Athletes from Shandong
Asian Games gold medalists for China
Asian Games medalists in athletics (track and field)
Athletes (track and field) at the 2014 Asian Games
Athletes (track and field) at the 2016 Summer Olympics
Olympic athletes of China
Medalists at the 2014 Asian Games